The Moosehead Grand Prix was an annual auto race held in Halifax, Nova Scotia, Canada. The race took place on a 1.15 mile (1.851 km) street circuit next to Citadel Hill from 1990 until 1993.  The race moved to a 1.45 mile (2.333 km) circuit on the runways of Canadian Forces Base Shearwater for 1994 and 1995.

History

Following the success of the Labatt sponsored Canadian Grand Prix in Montreal, the Molson sponsored IndyCar races in Toronto and Vancouver and the Grand Prix of Trois-Rivières, Moosehead Breweries wanted a high profile city street race in Atlantic Canada to promote their brand.  

The Moosehead Grand Prix was launched in 1990 with an American Indycar Series race on the streets next to Citadel Hill in downtown Halifax attracting 30,000 fans the first year.  The American IndyCar Series was replaced with the British Formula 2 Championship as the headliner in 1993 and 1994, with the IMSA GT Championship headlining the final year in 1995.

Other support series races included the Player’s Toyota Atlantic Championship, Rothmans Porsche Turbo Cup, Player’s GM Motorsport Series and the Canadian Formula Ford Championship.

Lap records

The fastest official race lap records at the Moosehead Grand Prix are listed as:

Winners

American Indycar Series

British F2 Championship

IMSA Exxon World Sports Car Championship and Supreme GT Series

Player's Toyota Atlantic Championship

Rothmans Porsche Turbo Cup

See also
Atlantic Motorsport Park

References

Motorsport in Canada
Auto races in Canada
Defunct motorsport venues in Canada
IMSA GT Championship circuits
Sport in Halifax, Nova Scotia